Kawaii  is the culture of cuteness in Japan. It can refer to items, humans and non-humans that are charming, vulnerable, shy and childlike. Examples include cute handwriting, certain genres of manga, anime, and characters including Hello Kitty and Pikachu from Pokémon.

The cuteness culture, or kawaii aesthetic, has become a prominent aspect of Japanese popular culture, entertainment, clothing, food, toys, personal appearance, and mannerisms.

Etymology
The word kawaii originally derives from the phrase  kao hayushi, which literally means "(one's) face (is) aglow," commonly used to refer to flushing or blushing of the face. The second morpheme is cognate with -bayu in mabayui (眩い, 目映い, or 目映ゆい) "dazzling, glaring, blinding, too bright; dazzlingly beautiful" (ma- is from  me "eye") and -hayu in omohayui (面映い or 面映ゆい) "embarrassed/embarrassing, awkward, feeling self-conscious/making one feel self-conscious" (omo- is from 面 omo, an archaic word for "face, looks, features; surface; image, semblance, vestige"). Over time, the meaning changed into the modern meaning of "cute" or "shine" , and the pronunciation changed to  kawayui and then to the modern  kawaii. It is commonly written in hiragana, but the ateji, has also been used. The kanji in the ateji literally translates to "able to love/be loved, can/may love, lovable."

History

Original definition

The original definition of kawaii came from Lady Murasaki's 11th century novel The Tale of Genji, where it referred to pitiable qualities. During the Shogunate period under the ideology of neo-Confucianism, women came to be included under the term kawaii as the perception of women being animalistic was replaced with the conception of women as docile. However, the earlier meaning survives into the modern Standard Japanese adjectival noun かわいそう kawaisō (often written with ateji as 可哀相 or 可哀想) "piteous, pitiable, arousing compassion, poor, sad, sorry" (etymologically from 顔映様 "face / projecting, reflecting, or transmitting light, flushing, blushing / seeming, appearance"). Forms of kawaii and its derivatives kawaisō and kawairashii (with the suffix -rashii "-like, -ly") are used in modern dialects to mean "embarrassing/embarrassed, shameful/ashamed" or "good, nice, fine, excellent, superb, splendid, admirable" in addition to the standard meanings of "adorable" and "pitiable."

Cute handwriting
In the 1970s, the popularity of the kawaii aesthetic inspired a style of writing. Many teenage girls participated in this style; the handwriting was made by writing laterally, often while using mechanical pencils. These pencils produced very fine lines, as opposed to traditional Japanese writing that varied in thickness and was vertical. The girls would also write in big, round characters and they added little pictures to their writing, such as hearts, stars, emoticon faces, and letters of the Latin alphabet.

These pictures made the writing very difficult to read. As a result, this writing style caused a lot of controversy and was banned in many schools. During the 1980s, however, this new "cute" writing was adopted by magazines and comics and was often put onto packaging and advertising of products, especially toys for children or “cute accessories”.

From 1984 to 1986,  studied the development of the cute handwriting (which he called Anomalous Female Teenage Handwriting) in depth. Although it was commonly thought that the writing style was something that teenagers had picked up from comics, Kazuma found that teenagers had come up with the style themselves, spontaneously, as an ‘underground trend’. His conclusion was based on an observation that cute handwriting predates the availability of technical means for producing rounded writing in comics.

Cute merchandise

, author of Cool Japan, says cute fashion in Japan can be traced back to the Edo period with the popularity of netsuke. Illustrator Rune Naito, who produced illustrations of "large-headed" (nitōshin) baby-faced girls and cartoon animals for Japanese girls' magazines from the 1950s to the 1970s, is credited with pioneering what would become the culture and aesthetic of kawaii.

Because of this growing trend, companies such as Sanrio came out with merchandise like Hello Kitty. Hello Kitty was an immediate success and the obsession with cute continued to progress in other areas as well. More recently, Sanrio has released kawaii characters with deeper personalities that appeal to an older audience, such as Gudetama and Aggretsuko. These characters have enjoyed strong popularity as fans are drawn to their unique quirks in addition to their cute aesthetics. The 1980s also saw the rise of cute idols, such as Seiko Matsuda, who is largely credited with popularizing the trend. Women began to emulate Seiko Matsuda and her cute fashion style and mannerisms, which emphasized the helplessness and innocence of young girls. The market for cute merchandise in Japan used to be driven by Japanese girls between 15 and 18 years old.

Aesthetics

, in his work Kawaii Syndrome, claims "cute" and "neat" have taken precedence over the former Japanese aesthetics of "beautiful" and "refined". As a cultural phenomenon, cuteness is increasingly accepted in Japan as a part of Japanese culture and national identity.

Physical attractiveness
In Japan, being cute is acceptable for both men and women. A trend existed of men shaving their legs to mimic the neotenic look. Japanese women often try to act cute to attract men. A study by Kanebo, a cosmetic company, found that Japanese women in their 20s and 30s favored the "cute look" with a "childish round face". Women also employ a look of innocence in order to further play out this idea of cuteness. Having large eyes is one aspect that exemplifies innocence; therefore many Japanese women attempt to alter the size of their eyes. To create this illusion, women may wear large contact lenses, false eyelashes, dramatic eye makeup, and even have an East Asian blepharoplasty, commonly known as double eyelid surgery.

Idols
 are media personalities in their teens and twenties who are considered particularly attractive or cute and who will, for a period ranging from several months to a few years, regularly appear in the mass media, e.g. as singers for pop groups, bit-part actors, TV personalities (tarento), models in photo spreads published in magazines, advertisements, etc. (But not every young celebrity is considered an idol. Young celebrities who wish to cultivate a rebellious image, such as many rock musicians, reject the "idol" label.) Speed, Morning Musume, AKB48, and Momoiro Clover Z are examples of popular idol groups in Japan during the 2000s & 2010s.

Cute fashion

Lolita

Lolita fashion is a very well-known and recognizable style in Japan. Based on Victorian fashion and the Rococo period, girls mix in their own elements along with gothic style to achieve the porcelain-doll look. The girls who dress in Lolita fashion try to look cute, innocent, and beautiful. This look is achieved with lace, ribbons, bows, ruffles, bloomers, aprons, and ruffled petticoats. Parasols, chunky Mary Jane heels, and Bo Peep collars are also very popular.

Sweet Lolita is a subset of Lolita fashion that includes even more ribbons, bows, and lace, and is often fabricated out of pastels and other light colors. Head-dresses such as giant bows or bonnets are also very common, while lighter make-up is sometimes used to achieve a more natural look. Curled hair extensions, sometimes accompanied by eyelash extensions, are also popular in helping with the baby doll look. Another subset of Lolita fashion related to "sweet Lolita" is Fairy Kei.

Themes such as fruits, flowers and sweets are often used as patterns on the fabrics used for dresses. Purses often go with the themes and are shaped as hearts, strawberries, or stuffed animals. Baby, the Stars Shine Bright is one of the more popular clothing stores for this style and often carries themes. Mannerisms are also important to many Sweet Lolitas. Sweet Lolita is sometimes not only a fashion, but also a lifestyle. This is evident in the 2004 film Kamikaze Girls where the main Lolita character, Momoko, drinks only tea and eats only sweets.

Gothic Lolita, Kuro Lolita, Shiro Lolita, and Military Lolita are all subtypes, also, in the US Anime Convention scene Casual Lolita.

Decora

Decora is a style that is characterized by wearing many "decorations" on oneself. It is considered to be self-decoration. The goal of this fashion is to become as vibrant and characterized as possible. People who take part in this fashion trend wear accessories such as multicolor hair pins, bracelets, rings, necklaces, etc. By adding on multiple layers of accessories on an outfit, the fashion trend tends to have a childlike appearance. It also includes toys and multicolor clothes. Decora and Fairy Kei have some crossover.

Kimo-kawaii

Kimo-kawaii means creepy-cute or gross-cute. The style started around the 1990s when some people lost interest in cute and innocent characters and fashion. It is usually achieved by wearing creepy or gross clothes or accessories. 

Kawaii men

Although typically a female-dominated fashion, some men partake in the kawaii trend. Men wearing masculine kawaii accessories is very uncommon, and typically the men cross-dress as kawaii women instead by wearing wigs, false eyelashes, applying makeup, and wearing kawaii female clothing. This is seen predominately in male entertainers, such as Torideta-san, a DJ who transforms himself into a kawaii woman when working at his nightclub.

Japanese pop stars and actors often have longer hair, such as Takuya Kimura of SMAP. Men are also noted as often aspiring to a neotenic look. While it doesn't quite fit the exact specifications of what cuteness means for females, men are certainly influenced by the same societal mores - to be attractive in a specific sort of way that the society finds acceptable. In this way both Japanese men and women conform to the expectations of Kawaii in some way or another.

Products
The concept of kawaii has had an influence on a variety of products, including candy, such as Hi-Chew, Koala's March and Hello Panda. Cuteness can be added to products by adding cute features, such as hearts, flowers, stars and rainbows. Cute elements can be found almost everywhere in Japan, from big business to corner markets and national government, ward, and town offices. Many companies, large and small, use cute mascots to present their wares and services to the public. For example:

 Pikachu, a character from Pokémon, adorns the side of ten ANA passenger jets, the Pokémon Jets.
 Asahi Bank used Miffy (Nijntje), a character from a Dutch series of children's picture books, on some of its ATM and credit cards.
 The prefectures of Japan, as well as many cities and cultural institutions, have cute mascot characters known as yuru-chara to promote tourism. Kumamon, the Kumamoto Prefecture mascot, and Hikonyan, the city of Hikone mascot, are among the most popular.
 The Japan Post "Yū-Pack" mascot is a stylized mailbox; they also use other cute mascot characters to promote their various services (among them the Postal Savings Bank) and have used many such on postage stamps.
 Some police forces in Japan have their own moe mascots, which sometimes adorn the front of kōban (police boxes).
 NHK, the public broadcaster, has its own cute mascots. Domokun, the unique-looking and widely recognized NHK mascot, was introduced in 1998 and quickly took on a life of its own, appearing in Internet memes and fan art around the world.
 Sanrio, the company behind Hello Kitty and other similarly cute characters, runs the Sanrio Puroland theme park in Tokyo, and painted on some EVA Air Airbus A330 jets as well. Sanrio’s line of more than 50 characters takes in more than $1 billion a year and it remains the most successful company to capitalize on the cute trend.

Cute can be also used to describe a specific fashion sense of an individual, and generally includes clothing that appears to be made for young children, apart from the size, or clothing that accentuates the cuteness of the individual wearing the clothing. Ruffles and pastel colors are commonly (but not always) featured, and accessories often include toys or bags featuring anime characters.

Non-kawaii imports

There have been occasions on which popular Western products failed to meet the expectations of kawaii, and thus did not do well in the Japanese market. For example, Cabbage Patch Kids dolls did not sell well in Japan, because the Japanese considered their facial features to be "ugly" and "grotesque" compared to the flatter and almost featureless faces of characters such as Hello Kitty. Also, the doll Barbie, portraying an adult woman, did not become successful in Japan compared to Takara's Licca, a doll that was modeled after an 11-year-old girl.

Industry
Kawaii has gradually gone from a small subculture in Japan to an important part of Japanese modern culture as a whole. An overwhelming number of modern items feature kawaii themes, not only in Japan but also worldwide. And characters associated with kawaii are astoundingly popular. "Global cuteness" is reflected in such billion-dollar sellers as Pokémon and Hello Kitty. "Fueled by Internet subcultures, Hello Kitty alone has hundreds of entries on eBay, and is selling in more than 30 countries, including Argentina, Bahrain, and Taiwan."

Japan has become a powerhouse in the kawaii industry and images of Doraemon, Hello Kitty, Pikachu, Sailor Moon and Hamtaro are popular in mobile phone accessories. However, Professor Tian Shenliang says that Japan's future is dependent on how much of an impact kawaii brings to humanity.

The Japanese Foreign Ministry has also recognized the power of cute merchandise and has sent three 18-year-old women overseas in the hopes of spreading Japanese culture around the world. The women dress in uniforms and maid costumes that are commonplace in Japan.

Kawaii manga and magazines have brought tremendous profit to the Japanese press industry. Moreover, the worldwide revenue from the computer game and its merchandising peripherals are closing in on $5 billion, according to a Nintendo press release titled "It's a Pokémon Planet".

Influence upon other cultures

In recent years, Kawaii products have gained popularity beyond the borders of Japan in other East and Southeast Asian countries, and are additionally becoming more popular in the US among anime and manga fans as well as others influenced by Japanese culture. Cute merchandise and products are especially popular in other parts of East Asia, such as mainland China, Hong Kong, Macau, Taiwan and South Korea, as well as Southeast Asian countries including the Philippines, Singapore, Thailand, and Vietnam.

Sebastian Masuda, owner of 6%DOKIDOKI and a global advocate for kawaii influence, takes the quality from Harajuku to Western markets in his stores and artwork. The underlying belief of this Japanese designer is that "kawaii" actually saves the world. The infusion of kawaii into other world markets and cultures is achieved by introducing kawaii via modern art; audio, visual, and written media; and the fashion trends of Japanese youth, especially in high school girls.

Japanese kawaii seemingly operates as a center of global popularity due to its association with making cultural productions and consumer products "cute". This mindset pursues a global market, giving rise to numerous applications and interpretations in other cultures.

The dissemination of Japanese youth fashion and "kawaii culture" is usually associated with the Western society and trends set by designers borrowed or taken from Japan. With the emergence of China, South Korea and Singapore as global economic centers, the Kawaii merchandise and product popularity has shifted back to the East. In these East Asian and Southeast Asian markets, the kawaii concept takes on various forms and different types of presentation depending on the target audience.

In East Asia and Southeast Asia 
Taiwanese culture, the government in particular, has embraced and elevated kawaii to a new level of social consciousness. The introduction of the A-Bian doll was seen as the development of a symbol to advance democracy and assist in constructing a collective imagination and national identity for Taiwanese people. The A-Bian dolls are kawaii likeness of sports figure, famous individuals, and now political figures that use kawaii images as a means of self-promotion and potential votes. The creation of the A-Bian doll has allowed Taiwanese President Chen Shui-bian staffers to create a new culture where the "kawaii" image of a politician can be used to mobilize support and gain election votes.

Japanese popular "kawaii culture" has had an effect on Singaporean youth. The emergence of Japanese culture can be traced back to the mid-1980s when Japan became one of the economic powers in the world. Kawaii has developed from a few children's television shows to an Internet sensation. Japanese media is used so abundantly in Singapore that youths are more likely to imitate the fashion of their Japanese idols, learn the Japanese language, and continue purchasing Japanese oriented merchandise.

The East Asian countries of Mainland China, Hong Kong, Taiwan and South Korea, as well as the Southeast Asian country of Thailand either produce kawaii items for international consumption or have websites that cater for kawaii as part of the youth culture in their country. Kawaii has taken on a life of its own, spawning the formation of kawaii websites, kawaii home pages, kawaii browser themes and finally, kawaii social networking pages. While Japan is the origin and Mecca of all things kawaii, artists and businesses around the world are imitating the kawaii theme.

Kawaii has truly become "greater" than itself. The interconnectedness of today's world via the Internet has taken kawaii to new heights of exposure and acceptance, producing a kawaii "movement".

The Kawaii concept has become something of a global phenomenon. The aesthetic cuteness of Japan is very appealing to people globally. The wide popularity of Japanese kawaii is often credited with it being "culturally odorless". The elimination of exoticism and national branding has helped kawaii to reach numerous target audiences and span every culture, class, and gender group. The palatable characteristics of kawaii have made it a global hit, resulting in Japan's global image shifting from being known for austere rock gardens to being known for "cute-worship".

In 2014, the Collins English Dictionary in the United Kingdom entered "kawaii" into its then latest edition, defining it as a "Japanese artistic and cultural style that emphasizes the quality of cuteness, using bright colours and characters with a childlike appearance".

Controversy 
In his book The Power of Cute, Simon May talks about the 180 degree turn in Japan’s history, from the violence of war to kawaii starting around the 1970s, in the works of artists like Takashi Murakami, amongst others. By 1992, kawaii was seen as "the most widely used, widely loved, habitual word in modern living Japanese." Since then, there has been some controversy surrounding the term kawaii and the expectations of it in Japanese culture. Natalia Konstantinovskaia, in her article “Being Kawaii in Japan”, says that based on the increasing ratio of young Japanese girls that view themselves as kawaii, there is a possibility that “from early childhood, Japanese people are socialized into the expectation that women must be kawaii.” The idea of kawaii can be tricky to balance - if a woman’s interpretation of kawaii seems to have gone too far, she is then labeled as burikko, “a woman who plays bogus innocence.” In the article “Embodied Kawaii: Girls’ voices in J-pop”, the authors make the argument that female J-pop singers are expected to be recognizable by their outfits, voice, and mannerisms as kawaii - young and cute. Any woman who becomes a J-pop icon must stay kawaii, or keep her girlishness, rather than being perceived as a woman, even if she is over 18.

Superficial Charm
Japanese women who feign kawaii behaviors (e.g., high-pitched voice, squealing giggles) that could be viewed as forced or inauthentic are called burikko and this is considered superficial charm. The neologism developed in the 1980s, perhaps originated by comedian .

See also

 Aegyo
 Camp (style)
 Chibi (slang)
 Culture of Japan
 Ingénue
 Kawaii metal, Kawaii bass (Music genre)
 Moe
 Yuru-chara

References

Further reading

 
 
 
 
 
 
 

Concepts in aesthetics
Japanese aesthetics
Japanese culture
Japanese fashion
Japanese popular culture
Japanese words and phrases